Jordi Tarrés may refer to:

 Jordi Tarrés (motorcycle trials rider) (born 1966), Spanish motorcycle trials rider in off-road competitions
 Jordi Tarrés (footballer) (born 1981), Hong Kong footballer